Oceloduri was an ancient Vaccean settlement in Spain near the modern town of Zamora.

References

Ancient history of the Iberian Peninsula